Anton von Padua Alfred Emil Hubert Georg Graf von Arco auf Valley (5 February 1897 – 29 June 1945), commonly known as Anton Arco-Valley, was a German far-right activist, Bavarian nationalist and nobleman. He assassinated the Bavarian prime minister Kurt Eisner, the first republican premier of Bavaria, on 21 February 1919.

Early life

Anton Arco-Valley was born in Sankt Martin im Innkreis in Upper Austria. His father Maximilian (1849–1911) was a businessman and estate owner, whose elder sister had married John Dalberg-Acton, 1st Baron Acton. Anton's mother, Emily Freiin von Oppenheim (1869–1957), was from a wealthy Jewish banking family. The ancestral home of the old noble family of Arco was the Arco Castle north of Lake Garda in Trentino. His family had lived in Germany for centuries. His noble title was no longer officially recognised after Germany became a republic.

After serving with a Bavarian regiment, the Royal Bavarian Infantry Lifeguards Regiment, in the last year of World War I, Anton returned from the front an angry and disillusioned German nationalist. He was an Austrian citizen by birth who later had adopted Germany as his home and he enrolled at Munich University. As a German nationalist and an aristocrat, a monarchist and a proclaimed anti-Semite despite his mother's Jewish descent, Anton detested Eisner, the Jewish leader of the Bavarian Independent Social Democratic Party of Germany and prime minister of the People's State of Bavaria.

Assassination of Eisner
Arco-Valley might have decided to kill Eisner to prove himself "worthy" after he had been rejected for membership of an ultra-nationalist group, the Thule Society, because he was partly of Jewish descent.

On 21 February 1919, on a Munich street, von Arco-Valley, acting alone, gunned down Eisner. The killing of Eisner made him a champion to many Bavarians. Students at the University publicly proclaimed him a hero. His action triggered bloody reprisals by communists and anarchists in Munich in which a number of people were killed, including Prince Gustav of Thurn and Taxis. Fighting broke out and the short-lived Bavarian Soviet Republic was established. Arco-Valley inspired the young Joseph Goebbels, who was in Munich at the time.

"Eisner's death," as Hitler saw it and would later write, "only hastened developments and led finally to the Soviet dictatorship, or to put it more correctly, to a passing rule of Jews, as had been the original aim of the instigators of the whole revolution".

Arco-Valley was tried for murder in January 1920. He was found guilty and sentenced to death, but his sentence was reduced to life imprisonment. The State Prosecutor said of him, "If the whole German youth were imbued with such a glowing enthusiasm we could face the future with confidence." He served his sentence at Landsberg Prison in cell 70, and in 1924 he was evicted from his cell to make way for Adolf Hitler. He was released in 1925, and was on probation until 1927, when he was pardoned.

Later life

Arco-Valley played only a minor part in politics thereafter. He supported a federalist vision of Germany, contrary to the Nazi party's centralist policies. Initially he worked as editor of the newspaper Bayerisches Vaterland (Bavarian Fatherland), and later as director of state funded operations at Süddeutsche Lufthansa, from which he resigned at the beginning of 1930. Arco-Valley was one of the most radical members of the monarchist-federalist wing of the Bavarian People's Party.

He was briefly held in "protective custody" by the Nazis when they took power because of his federalist views. A remark attributed to him that he would gladly assassinate again was interpreted as a threat to Hitler, but he was released when he promised to take no action against Hitler.

In June 1945, Arco-Valley was killed in a traffic accident in Salzburg. He was riding in a horse-drawn carriage when it collided with an American army vehicle. Two other passengers were injured, but Arco-Valley died at the scene.

Family
On 10 July 1934, he married his distant cousin Maria Gabrielle Countess (Gräfin) von Arco-Zinneberg, daughter of Count Joseph von und zu Arco-Zinneberg (great-grandson of Maria Leopoldine of Austria-Este) and Princess Wilhelmine von Auersperg.

Arco-Valley was survived by his wife, who died in 1987, his mother, and four daughters: Maria Wilhelmine Gräfin Apponyi von Nagy-Apponyi (1935–1987); Marie Ludmilla (born 1937); Maria Antonia Gräfin von Spaur und Flavon (born 1940) and Maria Leopoldine Stengel (born 1943). He was a contemporary of another distant cousin of rather different political views, the physicist/inventor Count Georg von Arco (1869–1940). Anton Graf von Arco's elder brother, Count Ferdinand (1893–1968), married Gertrud Wallenberg (1895–1983), member of the Swedish banking dynasty, and cousin of anti-Nazi hero Raoul Wallenberg.

References

External links
 

1897 births
1945 deaths
People from Ried im Innkreis District
20th-century Freikorps personnel
German monarchists
German people of Jewish descent
Anton
Counts of Germany
German assassins
German anti-communists
German nationalists
German people convicted of murder
German prisoners sentenced to death
Bavarian Soviet Republic
Thule Society members
Road incident deaths in Austria
German Army personnel of World War I
People convicted of murder by Germany
Prisoners sentenced to death by Germany